Mario Furore (born 25 December 1988, Foggia) is an Italian politician who was elected as a member of the European Parliament in 2019.

References

Living people
1988 births
MEPs for Italy 2019–2024
Five Star Movement MEPs
Five Star Movement politicians
People from Foggia